Rev. Mark James (19 October 1845 – 16 May 1898) was a British Anglican cleric who served as Rector of Pembroke and Devonshire, Bermuda, Canon of Bermuda Cathedral and de jure head of the Anglican Church of Bermuda.

Early life
James was born the son of Susan Georgiana Ryder, daughter of the Hon. Granville Ryder and Colonel Philip James who was the grandson of Charles Hamilton James, Count of Arran and Lt Col the Hon. Lockhart Gordon, third son of John Gordon, 3rd Earl of Aboyne, his aunt was Maria, Countess of Buchan. Following Oxford University he commissioned into the Royal Scots Greys, although shortly after, he left that for the church.

Career
Initially James was appointed to the Parish of Turks and Caicos Islands although in 1873 he was transferred to Pembroke Parish and Devonshire Parish as Rector. During his time as Rector, James oversaw the building and repairs of Trinity Church, the parish church of Pembroke, during this time, Trinity Church was termed a Chapel of ease for the Bishop of Newfoundland and Bermuda. However, in 1884, Trinity Church was destroyed by arson, and the building of the new Cathedral was started in 1885, at which point James was appointed Canon of Bermuda Cathedral. As Canon of Bermuda Cathedral and Vice-Chairman of the Building Committee, he approved the design and oversaw the collection for and construction of the new cathedral and was at the same time de jure suffragan Bishop of Bermuda. Although only Vice-Chairman, in reality, the Chairman, Llewellyn Jones, the Bishop of Newfoundland and Bermuda was seldom there, so James was de facto head of the committee. James died in office before the completion of the construction of Bermuda Cathedral and there remains a bell put up in memorial for him. His successor as Rector was James Davidson, later Archdeacon of Bermuda.

Personal life
Mark James married Caroline Ethel Gertrude Stewart, daughter of Admiral the Hon. Keith Stewart, son of George Stewart, 8th Earl of Galloway and Mary Caroline FitzRoy, daughter of Sir Charles Augustus FitzRoy, they had five children:
 Elsie James, married first Major Harold Frank Senior, secondly Captain Henry Arthur Trevor Brand, son of the Hon. Arthur Brand, MP.
 Dr. Philip William James MC, a Doctor in the Royal Army Medical Corps father of Professor Philip Seaforth James.
 Herbert Mark James, a Tea trader, father of Sqn Ldr Bertram Arthur James MC.
 Florence Margaret James, married Charles Shalders Rankin.
 Harry Eames James, Insurance Manager of the company Harry E. James Insurance, Inc. which merged with AON plc.

He also had another son by Araminta Winder Darrell, the granddaughter of Levin Winder.
 Captain Mark Darrell James, of the Royal Artillery who died playing Polo.

Mark James died on 16 May 1898 in Hamilton, Bermuda.

Ancestry

References

External links
 Peerage page
 The Rectors of Pembroke

1845 births
1898 deaths
19th-century Anglican priests
Bermudian Anglican priests
People from Pembroke Parish